John Allen House may refer to:

John Quincy Allen House, Buford, Georgia, listed on the National Register of Historic Places (NRHP)
John C. Allen House, Summersville, Kentucky, listed on the NRHP in Green County, Kentucky
John Allen House (Keene, Kentucky), listed on the NRHP in Woodford County, Kentucky

See also
Allen House (disambiguation)